Hamarat (also, Gamarat) is a village and municipality in the Lerik Rayon of Azerbaijan.  It has a population of 894.  The municipality consists of the villages of Hamarat and Dızdipok.

References 

Populated places in Lerik District